Grodno County was a county in the Northeast of Białystok Voivodeship of the Second Polish Republic.

Former counties of Poland